Kantadhee Kusiri (born 19 May 1993) is a Thai racing driver currently competing in the TCR International Series and TCR Thailand Touring Car Championship. Having previously competed in the Thailand Super Series, Pro Racing Series and Thai Honda Jazz Cup amongst others.

Racing career
Kusiri began his career in 2009 in the Thai Honda Civic Racing Festival, he finished second in the championship standings that year. He switched to the Thai Honda Jazz Cup in 2010 and won the title that year. In 2011 he switched to the Pro Racing Series, winning the championship twice in 2011 and 2014. For 2012 he switched to the Thai Touring Car Series, finishing second in the championship that year. He switched to the Thailand Super Series for 2013, winning the S1500 class that season, he also took part in the Sepang 12 Hours that year, winning the Touring Production class. In 2014 he continued in the Thailand Super Series, finishing third in the S2000 class in both 2014 and 2015. He switched to the Euroformula Open Championship for 2015 doing a partial season, before returning for a full season in 2016.

In August 2016 it was announced that he would race in the TCR International Series, driving a Honda Civic TCR for Team Eakie BBR Kaiten.

Racing record

Complete TCR International Series results
(key) (Races in bold indicate pole position) (Races in italics indicate fastest lap)

Complete Porsche Supercup results
(key) (Races in bold indicate pole position) (Races in italics indicate fastest lap)

⹋ No points awarded as less than 50% of race distance was completed.

References

External links
 
 

1993 births
Living people
Kantadhee Kusiri
Kantadhee Kusiri
TCR International Series drivers
Euroformula Open Championship drivers
24H Series drivers
Porsche Supercup drivers
FIA Motorsport Games drivers
TCR Asia Series drivers
RP Motorsport drivers
Kantadhee Kusiri